Rameez Shahzad (born 30 November 1987) is a Pakistani-born cricketer who played for the United Arab Emirates national cricket team. A right-handed batsman and off spin bowler, he has played for the United Arab Emirates national cricket team since 2005, including three first-class matches. He made his One Day International (ODI) debut against Scotland on 14 August 2016 in the 2015–17 ICC World Cricket League Championship. He made his Twenty20 International (T20I) debut for the United Arab Emirates against Afghanistan on 14 December 2016.

Biography
Born in Lahore in 1987, the son of Shehzad Altaf, Rameez Shahzad first represented the UAE at Under-15 level, playing in the Under-15 Asia Cup in Dubai in December 2002. He first represented the senior side in 2005, playing in an ICC Intercontinental Cup match against Ireland in October. He played for the Under-19 team in the ACC Under-19 Cup in Nepal the following month.

He returned to the senior side to play in the 2006 ACC Trophy in Malaysia and played twice in the 2006 ICC Intercontinental Cup; against Namibia and Scotland. He most recently represented his country in the 2008 ACC Trophy Elite tournament in Kuala Lumpur.

In January 2018, he was named in the United Arab Emirates's squad for the 2018 ICC World Cricket League Division Two tournament.

Following the conclusion of the 2018 Cricket World Cup Qualifier tournament, the International Cricket Council (ICC) named Shahzad as the rising star of the United Arab Emirates's squad.

In August 2018, he was named in the United Arab Emirates' squad for the 2018 Asia Cup Qualifier tournament. In December 2018, he was named in the United Arab Emirates' team for the 2018 ACC Emerging Teams Asia Cup. Later the same month, he was one of three players to be given an eight-week ban from international cricket for breaching the Emirates Cricket Board's Player's Code of Conduct, after using Twitter to criticise the facilities in Karachi during the tournament. In January 2019, the Pakistan Cricket Board (PCB) had accepted apologies from all the cricketers involved. In March 2019, he returned to the UAE's squad following his suspension for their series against the United States.

In June 2019, he was selected to play for the Winnipeg Hawks franchise team in the 2019 Global T20 Canada tournament. In September 2019, he was named in the United Arab Emirates' squad for the 2019 ICC T20 World Cup Qualifier tournament in the UAE.

References

1987 births
Living people
Cricketers from Lahore
Emirati cricketers
United Arab Emirates One Day International cricketers
United Arab Emirates Twenty20 International cricketers
Pakistani emigrants to the United Arab Emirates
Pakistani expatriate sportspeople in the United Arab Emirates